Kelly Kim (born November 1976) is a poker player from Whittier, California, primarily known for his 8th-place finish at the 2008 World Series of Poker Main Event, earning $1,288,217.

Kim was born in Los Angeles, California and graduated from the University of California, San Diego. He worked as a business analyst before turning to poker full-time.

He finished 398th in the 2005 World Series of Poker and earned $18,335.

Now has a daughter named Kaitlyn Kim and who both currently reside in Southern California.

As of 2009, his total live poker tournament winnings exceed $1,600,000. His seven cashes at the WSOP account for $1,364,273 of those winnings.

References

American poker players
American people of Korean descent
Living people
1976 births